Saban's Xyber 9: New Dawn is an American animated television series produced by Bokabi and Saban Entertainment. It originally debuted on the Fox Kids network on September 25, 1999. Only 10 episodes aired before it was cancelled on December 4, 1999. Soon after, it was aired in its entirety on Irish television network RTÉ Two from 2 July to August 2001. Six years later, it appeared on Toon Disney as part of the channel's Jetix line up. In addition to re-airing the first 10 episodes, the remaining 12 episodes aired from February 24, 2007, through April 8, 2007, although these episodes were made in 2000.

Ownership of the series passed to Disney in 2001 when Disney acquired Fox Kids Worldwide, which also includes Saban Entertainment. The series is not available on Disney+.

Synopsis

Jack, a precocious, blonde fifteen-year-old who is an orphan, is given the title of the Chosen One. The people of Terrana, a futuristic realm that is amidst a war, relies upon him as the last hope to save their civilization. If Jack can achieve the Herculean task of destroying Machestro, the evil ruler of the underworld, he will be named king. Jack's greatest weapon against Machestro is the sophisticated computer Xyber 9 that is in the form of a staff. With Xyber 9's power, Jack journeys through Machestro's underworld and to other futuristic lands, fighting intergalactic evil with an ever-increasing band of allies. In order to enfeeble the Chosen One, Machestro tries desperately to snare Xyber 9 for without the powerful computer, Jack would be defenseless. And with it, Machestro could spread his disease of evil throughout Terrana and beyond, conquering other worlds and ruling in his tyranny. He even does his plots with the aid of King Renard.

At the end of the original run, Jack finds the protected valley, a location left by Terrana's advanced ancestors and a protected valley with genetically-altered crops that could grow in two days time, and need very little water and nutrients, which Jack shows to the people to help return Terrana back into its previous state. It is also revealed that Machestro rules over the Machina by giving them hope that they will be able to reclaim the surface by turning it dark. This is because the Machina have a virus that causes them to be in great pain when traveling into the sunlight believing it will kill them due to a curse. Ikira, a former Machina learned that even though the sunlight causes great pain, it is the cure to the infection after which they would be able to walk on the surface. Machestro knows this, but does not let the Machina know out of fear of them removing him as leader.

Characters

Heroes
 Jack (voiced by Jason Marsden) - A 15-year-old orphan who becomes the Chosen one for the people of Terrana after he discovers Xyber 9. He hates to be called "boy" and insists to be called by his name. He is not afraid to stand up and fight, though they lead him to be impulsive at times.
 Xyber 9 (voiced by René Auberjonois) - The last known Xyber, or thinking machine, who was given the ability to have independent thought that acts as Jack's weapon against Machestro and other threats to Terrana. He often talks with sarcasm or a high society view on the poor world but is often the voice of reason to Jack. Xyber 9 does not appreciate it when Jack uses him as a tool of any kind especially when it involves being used to whack enemies or as a pick to dig.
 Anakonda (voiced by Nika Futterman) - Also known as Ana, Anakonda is a mysterious red-haired girl from the Dark Lands. Raised by snakes, Ana's name is actually a nickname from Jack as her real name was too long. She is in tune with nature and can hear things that others cannot and sense things due to honed senses. She has obvious feelings for Jack as she kissed him after she thought he had died. However, she is a fearsome warrior who is not afraid to give a smart remark. Also, she is jealous of Roselyn's affections for Jack and often comments about her pampered ways which are a sharp contrast to her own jungle background.
 Ikira (voiced by Christopher Marquette) - A legendary swordsman who joins Jack on his quest as a teacher and is a former Machina. Cured when as a punishment the Machina tied him to a rock of the surface to be killed by the sunlight, but ended up being cured of the Machina infection instead.
 Mick (voiced by Quinton Flynn) - A young man who loves big machines and pretty girls. He is confident and is not afraid to jump in a situation if it means a chance for a reward such as jewels or money. He is cocky, somewhat selfish, and quite proud of his abilities, though he has more than once gotten into a tight spot due to this. Just hearing the word "treasure" causes him to go into a frenzy to try to obtain a gold or jewel trinket. But despite his view of always doing something to get a reward, he has more than once come to the aid of one of his teammates even if it means putting himself at risk.
 Willy (voiced by Rodney Saulsberry) - Teammate of Mick, Willy is a tall strong black man who is an excellent cook. However, he knows his way in a fight and can handle various types of weaponry. He is the most silent one in the group but when he talks it is usually with sense and he is the one who can best put a lid on Mick's remarks often telling him "Mick... you're a foo'" or simply telling his friend to shut up.
 Queen Tatania (voiced by Dominique Jennings) - A courageous dark-skinned woman who leads her soldiers without fear against King Renard and offers an alliance with Jack after he saves her life. Despite the fact Jack gets into much trouble and she initially doesn't believe his tales of the Machina, she maintains faith in him.
 Princess Roselyn (voiced by Jolie Jenkins) - The daughter of King Renard who seems to have feelings for Jack as he does for she. She was ignorant of her father's evil actions but learned first hand about the other side to her father. She then realized that she had to grow up to save the kingdom from her father's tyrant ways. She and Ana are somewhat jealous of each other for being affiliated with Jack, seeing the other as a threat, even sizing one another up in more than one episode by picking on their differences due to their backgrounds.

Villains
 Machestro (voiced by Tony Jay) - An evil Machina who rules the underworld of Machina and wishes to take over Terrana. Like all Machina, he too is sensitive to sunlight as seen in episode 1 when his face begins to burn, resulting in him wearing a darkened face helmet to protect himself.
 King Renard (voiced by Tim Curry) - Beloved by his followers, he is secretly in allegiance with Machestro in his attempts to steal Xyber 9 so they can take over other worlds. He follows Machestro without question in hoping of being his ruling right-hand man.

Other characters
 Honk (vocal effects provided by Frank Welker) - A strange pig/bulldog mix creature with horns, he befriended Jack after Jack saved his life and he tags along. He tries his best to defend his master, but is often reduced to simply doing his name sake: honk.
 Captain Montand (voiced by Tom Kane) - The leader of Queen Tatiana's cavalry. He is the one who voices the most doubt about Jack being on their side but eventually learns to trust him despite not agreeing with his methods. He does things by the book and is constantly telling Jack not to act solo and put himself at risk so much. However he recognizes Jack's courage and heroism and finally accepts him after Jack saves his life and almost sacrifices his own to save everyone else.
 Miss Thorpe - The teacher and escort for Princess Roselyn. She is somewhat strict with her but obviously has the princess' best interests at heart and will even tease her, letting the princess have a free rein. In reality she is a form of freedom fighter in King Renard's kingdom who hides in the shadows but she holds priority over guarding Roselyn. Mick has a crush on her to which she brushes off or acts coy.
 Machina - The Machina are a race of people who live underground and wear full body suits with masks. They are the people led by Machestro and fear the sunlight as it causes them to experience excruciating pain when it hits their skin. Therefore, they never go above ground without clothing that fully covers their bodies and features even then a strong blast of sunlight will still cause them pain. Prior to the series, Ikira discovered that after several hours of direct exposure to sunlight, Machina will not die, but be cured if they can endure the considerable pain. The grunts Machestro uses are known as "Tunnel Rats."
 Tekada - A short Machina who is a form of adviser to Machestro. He is often the brunt of Machestro's displays of anger though he tries his best to appease his lord and give advice.
 Slick - An old friend of Mick's who now works for King Renard because of good pay but admits he plunders on the side. He previously stole Mick's diamonds as well as his girl, leaving Mick all but happy as he took the rap. He is as his name implies: slick and untrustworthy.

Episodes

References

External links

1990s American animated television series
2000s American animated television series
1999 American television series debuts
2007 American television series endings
Fox Kids
American children's animated action television series
American children's animated adventure television series
American children's animated science fiction television series
American television series revived after cancellation
Fictional computers
Fox Broadcasting Company original programming
Television series by Saban Entertainment
Animated television series about orphans